Abraham Cherono (born 21 July 1980 in Keiyo District) is a Kenyan runner who specializes in the 3000 metres steeplechase and cross-country running.

He is the older brother of Stephen Cherono, who moved to Qatar and changed his name to Saif Saaeed Shaheen.

Achievements

2nd to Paul Tergat in Kenya world cross country trials 2000

Personal bests
3000 meters - 7:41.17 (2000)
5000 meters - 13:15.7 (2000)
3000 meters steeplechase - 8:10.33 (2003)

References

External links
 
 

1980 births
Living people
People from Elgeyo-Marakwet County
Kenyan male middle-distance runners
Kenyan male long-distance runners
Kenyan male steeplechase runners
Commonwealth Games medallists in athletics
Commonwealth Games bronze medallists for Kenya
Kenyan male cross country runners
Athletes (track and field) at the 2002 Commonwealth Games
21st-century Kenyan people
Medallists at the 2002 Commonwealth Games